Prof William Witte FRSE (1907–1992) was a 20th century scholar of the German language and German literature, working in Britain.

In 1959 he postulated that Schiller's Ode to Joy was specifically rewritten in 1803 following influence on Schiller by the works of Robert Burns.

Life

He was born in Bratislava in Slovakia (then known as Pressburg) on 18 February 1907, the son of William G. J. Witte. His family travelled widely, and he was educated in Poland and Austria and then attended the University of Munich in Germany. After a year at the University of Berlin he ended in Breslau University (then in Germany, now Wroclaw in Poland) where he gained as doctorate in Economics in 1930.

In 1931 he left mainland Europe to go to Aberdeen University in Scotland asassistant lecturer in German. In 1936 he transferred to Edinburgh University in the same role for one year before returning to Aberdeen, with a PhD from Edinburgh. As a non-German German-speaker he survived the rigours of the Second World War and began to climb in position. He was created Professor of German in 1951. Most of his years in Aberdeen he lived on Don Street close to the university.

The University of London awarded him an honorary doctorate (DLitt) in 1966. In 1978 he was elected a Fellow of the Royal Society of Edinburgh. His proposers were Thomas Malcolm Knox, Fraser Noble, Robert Cross and Anthony Elliot Ritchie.

He died on 22 September 1992. He is memorialised in the Snow Kirk in Old Aberdeen.

Publications

Modern German Prose Usage (1937)
Schiller (1949)
Schiller and Burns (1959)
German Romance and German Romanticism (1963, republished 1975)
German Life and Letters (1977)

Other Awards and Positions
Gold Medal from the Goethe Institute of Munich in 1971
Cross of an Officer of Merit (First Class) from the Federal Republic of Germany in 1974
Queen's Jubilee Medal in 1977
Chairman of the Narional Conference of University Teachers of German in Great Britain in Ireland in both 1970 and 1971
Vice Chairman of the Society of British German Studies from 1982

Family
In 1937 he married Edith Mary Stenhouse Melvin, a linguist, and eldest daughter of the headmaster of Turriff Secondary School.

References

1907 births
1992 deaths
Writers from Bratislava
Academics of the University of Aberdeen
Fellows of the Royal Society of Edinburgh
Slovak emigrants to the United Kingdom